Kamasami Kong DJ Special (カマサミコングDJスペシャル) is the first compilation album by Kiyotaka Sugiyama & Omega Tribe released by VAP on March 21, 1985. The compilation peaked at No. 19 on the Oricon charts.

Background and composition 

Hawaiian DJ Kamasami Kong had known of the band since its inception, directly playing a role in the name of the band itself. With the completion of the band's fourth studio album, Another Summer, on May 20, 1985, the band had decided that they would break up shortly after a release of another compilation on October 23. They released the DJ Special a day after. The compilation was structured like a radio program and included song introductions, program jingles, and receiving requests from listeners by phone. This pseudo-program was labeled as KIKI in Hawaii, with Kong using his real name during the album.

The compilation was included in the 35th Anniversary All Singles collection released in 2018.

Charts

References 

1985 compilation albums